The Ministry of Transport of Argentina is a ministry of the national executive power that manages issues pertaining to land, air and sea transportation within the country's limits.

First founded in 1949, the Ministry was most recently split off from the Ministry of the Interior and Transport in 2015. Diego Giuliano of the Renewal Front has served as Minister of Transport since 29 November 2022, following the resignation of Alexis Guerrera.

History
The first Ministry of Transport was formed in 1949 during the presidency of Juan Domingo Perón. The first minister responsible was army colonel Juan Francisco Castro, who was in office until 1952. The military governments of Eduardo Lonardi and Pedro Eugenio Aramburu retained the ministry in their cabinets, but in 1958 the government of Arturo Frondizi downgraded the ministry to a secretariat, which in the following years went on to depend on various ministries, chiefly that of Public Works.

In 2012, during the presidency of Cristina Fernández de Kirchner, the Ministry of the Interior was renamed as Ministry of the Interior and Transport, as the secretariat was moved to the Interior Ministry and regained ministerial status, albeit jointly with the Interior portfolio. The presidency of Mauricio Macri saw the Transport portfolio upgraded to ministerial status once again; the first minister responsible this time was Guillermo Dietrich.

Structure and dependencies
The Ministry of Transport counts with a number of centralized and decentralized dependencies. The centralized dependencies, as in other government ministers, are known as secretariats (secretarías) and undersecretariats (subsecretarías):
Secretariat of Transport Management (Secretaría de Gestión de Transporte)
Undersecretariat of Rail Transport (Subsecretaría de Transporte Ferroviario)
Undersecretariat of Automotive Transport (Subsecretaría de Transporte Automotor)
Undersecretariat of Ports, Waterways and Merchant Navy (Subsecretaría de Puertos, Vías Navegables y Marina Mercante)
Secretariat of Transport Planning (Secretaría de Planificación de Transporte)
Undersecretariat of Transport Planning and Coordination (Subsecretaría de Planificación y Coordinación de Transporte)
Secretariat of Interjurisdictional Articulation (Secretaría de Articulación Interjurisdiccional)
Undersecretariat of Transport Economic and Financial Policy (Subsecretaría de Política Económica y Financiera de Transporte)
Undersecretariat of Strategic Projects and Technologic Development (Subsecretaría de Proyectos Estratégicos y Desarrollo Tecnológico)

Several decentralized agencies also report to the Ministry of Transport, such as the National Road Safety Agency (ANSV), the National Transport Regulation Commission (CNRT), the Transport Safety Board, the National Civil Aviation Administration (ANAC), the Civil Aviation Accident Investigation Board, the National Airports System Regulatory Body (ORSNA), the Argentine National Transport Institute, and the General Ports Administration (AGP). Several state-owned enterprises are also overseen by the Ministry of Transport, such as Argentina's flag carrier Aerolíneas Argentinas, Operadora Ferroviaria S.E., Ferrocarriles Argentinos, ADIFSE, and Trenes Argentinos Cargas.

Headquarters
The Ministry of Transport is headquartered in the Palacio de Hacienda ("Palace of the Treasury"), located in the Monserrat barrio in Buenos Aires, which has historically housed the Ministry of Economy (formerly known as the Ministry of the Treasury) as well as other ministerial portfolios such as public works and production. The building was built in two stages from 1937 to 1950 and stands on Hipólito Yrigoyen street, across from the emblematic Plaza de Mayo square and the Casa Rosada, seat of the Presidency.

List of ministers

References

External links
 

Transport
Argentina
Argentina
1949 establishments in Argentina